This is a list of people associated with Woodstock College, a former Jesuit seminary in Maryland.

Alumni
Joaquin G. Bernas
Horacio de la Costa, the first Filipino Provincial General of the Society of Jesus in the Philippines 
George Coyne, director of the Vatican Observatory 1978-2006 
Royden B. Davis, Dean of Georgetown College from 1966 to 1989 
James Demske, S.J., President of Canisius College (1966–1993)
Timothy S. Healy, 46th President of Georgetown University
Thomas M. King, theologian 
Charles W. Lyons, president of several Catholic colleges
James A. Martin, the world's oldest Jesuit priest at the time of his death in 2007
W. G. Read Mullan, 11th President of Boston College and 11th President of Loyola College in Maryland
John H. O'Rourke, famous Jesuit priest (1856-1929) 
J. Hunter Guthrie, President of Georgetown University
Gerard Reedy, 30th President of the College of the Holy Cross
Harold Ridley, 23rd President of Loyola College in Maryland 
Thomas Ewing Sherman, S.J., son of William Tecumseh Sherman.
Eugene Ulrich, professor at the University of Notre Dame

Faculty
Avery Dulles (professor, 1960–1974) 
Anthony Maas (professor, 1891–1905; rector, 1907–1912) 
Leo J. O'Donovan 
Edward J. Sponga (head, 1957–1960)

References

Woodstock College people
Woodstock College